Life Goes On is the tenth and final studio album from Scottish soft rock musician Gerry Rafferty. Released on 30 November 2009 by Hypertension Music, it was the singer's final recording published before his 2011 death.

Reception
Writing for Is this music?, Gary Marshall gave the album a three out of five, praising the singer's voice and some select tracks but noting that the album is over-produced and clearly made up of leftovers from previous albums.

Track listing
All songs written by Gerry Rafferty, except where noted.
"Kyrie Eleison" (Wolfgang Amadeus Mozart) – 3:50
"The Waters of Forgetfulness" (New Edit) – 4:53
"Don't Speak of My Heart" (Gerry Rafferty, Jim Rafferty) – 5:58
"Because" (John Lennon, Paul McCartney) – 2:47
"Everytime I Wake Up" (New Edit) (Rafferty, with a reading from Rainer Maria Rilke) – 5:20
"Love and Affection" (New Edit) – 5:57
"The Land of the Chosen Few" (New Edit) – 4:00
"Life Goes On" (New Edit) – 3:06
"Another World" (New Edit) – 3:52
"Time's Caught Up On You" (New Edit) – 3:51
"Conscious Love" – 4:28
"Over My Head" – 2:50
"Hang On" – 4:02
"It's Easy to Talk" – 4:34
"The Maid of Culmore" (Traditional) – 4:08
"Your Heart's Desire" – 5:51
"Adeste Fidelis" (Traditional) – 4:08
"Silent Night" – 3:30

Personnel
"Kyrie Eleison"
Andy Patterson – bells, programming, engineering
Gerry Rafferty – vocals, programming
Giles Twigg – percussion, engineering

"The Waters of Forgetfulness"
Arran Ahmun – drums, percussion
Mel Collins – saxophone
Doug Cook – engineering
Brad Davis – engineering
Brian Europe – assistant and vocal engineering
Philippe Garcia – engineering
Tom Gonzalez – vocal engineering
Bryn Haworth – guitar
Barry Hammond – drum engineering
Jean Jacques Lemoine – engineering
Hugh Murphy – engineering, recording, production
Chris Potter – engineering
Don Priest – engineering
Gerry Rafferty – vocals, programming, production
Pavel Rosak – keyboards, bass guitar, percussion, brass, marimba
Tim Young – additional engineering
Recorded and engineered at Icon Studios, East Sussex, England, United Kingdom; with additional recording at Studio Miraval, France and Blue Wave Recording Studios, St. Philip, Barbados; and Parkgate Studios, Sussex, England, United Kingdom; drums recorded at Chipping Norton Studios, Oxfordshire, England, United Kingdom; mixed at The Hit Factory, London, England, United Kingdom; cut at Metropolis Mastering, London, England, United Kingdom

"Don't Speak of My Heart"
Arran Ahmun – hi-hat, cymbal, tambourine
Hugh Burns – electric guitar
Lianne Carroll – backing vocals
Doug Cook – assistant engineering
Joe Egan – backing vocals
Mo Foster – bass guitar
Barry Hammond – additional engineering
Melanie Harrold – backing vocals
Andrew Jackman – bassoon and string arrangement
Julian Littman – backing vocals
Nicky Moore – backing vocals
Hugh Murphy – production
Dan Priest – mixing
Gerry Rafferty – backing and lead vocals, high-string guitar, programming, production
Pavel Rosak – keyboards, drum programming
Mike Ross – string recording
Gavin Wright – strings
Recorded and engineered at Tye Farm, with additional recording at Chipping Norton Studios, strings recorded at The Hit Factory, mixed at Parkgate Studios.

"Because"
Andy Patterson – engineering
Gerry Rafferty – vocals, programming
Giles Twigg – engineering

"Everytime I Wake Up"
Arran Ahmun – percussion
Kenny Craddock – Hammond organ, keyboards
Brian Europe – assistant engineering
Mo Foster – bass guitar
Zahir Kahn – assistant engineering
Gerry Rafferty – backing and lead vocals, electric guitar, programming
Martin Raymond – assistant engineering
Ronnie Rehse – German reading
Arturo Tappin – saxophone
Giles Twigg – drums, percussion, guitar, reading from Digital Delirium, programming, engineering

"Love and Affection"
Arran Ahmun – hi-hat, cymbal, tambourine
Hugh Burns – electric guitar
Doug Cook – assistant engineering
Mo Foster – bass guitar
Barry Hammond – additional engineering
Andrew Jackman – horn, oboe, and string arrangement
Hugh Murphy – production
Andy Patterson – engineering
Dan Priest – mixing
Gerry Rafferty – backing and lead vocals, programming, production
Pavel Rosak – keyboards, drum programming
Mike Ross – string recording
Giles Twigg – engineering
Gavin Wright – strings
Recorded and engineered at Tye Farm, with additional recording at Chipping Norton Studios, strings recorded at The Hit Factory, mixed at Parkgate Studios.

"The Land of the Chosen Few"
Gerry Rafferty – backing and lead vocals, acoustic guitar, programming
Giles Twigg – drums, percussion, programming, engineering
Backing tracks recorded and completed at Icon Studios. Bagpipes, German monologue, and some of Gerry Rafferty's backing vocals and acoustic guitars recorded at Skibo Castle, Dornoch, Sutherland, Scotland, United Kingdom. Final mixes completed at Icon Studios in October 2000.

"Life Goes On"
Arran Ahmun – hi-hat, cymbal, tambourine
Hugh Burns – guitar
Mel Collins – saxophone
Doug Cook – assistant engineering
Mo Foster – bass guitar
Barry Hammond – additional engineering
Andrew Jackman – string arrangement
Hugh Murphy – production
Andy Patterson – engineering
Dan Priest – mixing
Pavel Rosak – keyboards, bass guitar and drum programming
Gerry Rafferty – backing and lead vocals, programming, production
Mike Ross – string recording
Giles Twigg – engineering
Gavin Wright – strings
Recorded and engineered at Tye Farm, with additional recording at Chipping Norton Studios, strings recorded at The Hit Factory, mixed at Parkgate Studios.

"Another World"
Doug Cook – assistant engineering
Kenny Craddock – Hammond organ, keyboards
Brian Europe – assistant engineering
Zahir Khan – assistant engineering
Pino Palladino – bass guitar
Martin Raymond – assistant engineering
Gerry Rafferty – backing and lead vocals, electric piano, programming
Giles Twigg – bass guitar and drum programming, engineering
Recorded and engineered at Tye Farm, with additional recording at Chipping Norton Studios, strings recorded at The Hit Factory, mixed at Parkgate Studios. Backing track recorded at Blue Wave Recording Studios, completed at Icon Studios.

"Time's Caught Up On You"
Arran Ahmun – hi-hat, cymbal, tambouring, toms, cowbell, congas, talking drum, agogô, finger cymbals
Hugh Burns – guitar
Lianne Carroll – backing vocals
B. J. Cole – pedal steel guitar
Mel Collins – saxophone
Doug Cook – assistant engineering
Joe Egan – backing vocals
Barry Hammond – additional engineering
Melanie Harrold – backing vocals
Julian Littman – backing vocals
Nicky Moore – backing vocals
Hugh Murphy – production
Dan Priest – mixing
Pavel Rosak – keyboards; bass guitar, drum, and percussion programming
Mike Ross – string recording
Gerry Rafferty – backing and lead vocals, acoustic guitar, programming, production
Gavin Wright – strings

"Conscious Love"
Arran Ahmun – percussion
Kenny Craddock – Hammond organ, keyboards
Brian Europe – assistant engineering
Karen Griffiths – backing vocals
Bryn Haworth – slide guitar
Zahir Kahn – assistant engineering
Mark Knopfler – electric guitar
Cindy Legall – backing vocals
Tamara Marshall – backing vocals
Pino Palladino – bass guitar
Gerry Rafferty – backing and lead vocals, electric piano, programming, production
Martin Raymond – assistant engineering
Giles Twigg – drum and percussion programming, engineering
Backing track recorded at Blue Wave Recording Studios, completed at Icon Studios.

"Over My Head"
Arran Ahmun – drums
Doug Cook – additional engineering
Brad Davis – additional engineering
Brian Europe – assistant vocal engineering
Mo Foster – bass guitar
Philippe Garcia – assistant engineering
Tom Gonzalez – vocal engineering
Barry Hammond – drum engineering
Jean Jacques Lemoine – engineering
Ian Lynn – keyboards, strings
Hugh Murphy – engineering, recording, production
Andy Patterson – engineering
Chris Potter – additional and assistant engineering
Dan Priest – additional engineering
Gerry Rafferty – acoustic guitar, vocals, production
Tim Young – additional engineering
Recorded and engineered at Icon Studios, East Sussex, England, United Kingdom; with additional recording at Studio Miraval, France and Blue Wave Recording Studios, St. Philip, Barbados; and Parkgate Studios, Sussex, England, United Kingdom; drums recorded at Chipping Norton Studios, Oxfordshire, England, United Kingdom; mixed at The Hit Factory, London, England, United Kingdom; cut at Metropolis Mastering, London, England, United Kingdom

"Hang On"
Arran Ahmun – hi-hat, cymbal, tambouring
Mel Collins – saxophone
Doug Cook – assistant engineering
Joe Egan – backing vocals
Mo Foster – bass guitar
Bryn Haworth – bottleneck guitar
Barry Hammond – additional engineering
Julian Littman – backing vocals
Nicky Moore – backing vocals
Hugh Murphy – production
Andy Patterson – engineering
Dan Priest – mixing
Gerry Rafferty – backing and lead vocals, programming, production
Mike Ross – string recording
Pavel Rosak – keyboards, drum and percussion programming
Gavin Wright – strings
Recorded and engineered at Tye Farm, with additional recording at Chipping Norton Studios, strings recorded at The Hit Factory, mixed at Parkgate Studios.

"It's Easy to Talk"
Arran Ahmun – hi-hat, cymbal, tambourine
Lianne Carroll – backing vocals
B.J. Cole – pedal steel guitar
Doug Cook – assistant engineering
Joe Egan – backing vocals
Mo Foster – bass guitar
Barry Hammond – additional engineering
Melanie Harrold – backing vocals
Bryn Haworth – bottleneck guitar
Julian Littman – backing vocals
Nicky Moore – backing vocals
Hugh Murphy – production
Andy Patterson – engineering
Dan Priest – additional engineering
Gerry Rafferty – backing and lead vocals, acoustic guitar, programming, production
Pavel Rosak – keyboards, drum and percussion programming
Mike Ross – string recording
Gavin Wright – strings
Recorded and engineered at Tye Farm, with additional recording at Chipping Norton Studios, strings recorded at The Hit Factory, mixed at Parkgate Studios.

"The Maid of Culmore"
Andy Patterson – engineering
Gerry Rafferty – back and lead vocals, programming
Giles Twigg – engineering

"Your Heart's Desire"
Arran Ahmun – drums and percussion
Alan Clark – Hammond organ, keyboards, synthesizer
Mel Collins – saxophone
Kenny Craddock – Hammond organ, keyboards, synthesizer
Jerry Donahue – electric rhythm guitar
Mo Foster – fretless bass guitar
Gerry Rafferty – harmony and lead vocals, organ, synthesizer, acoustic guitar, piano, programming
Andy Patterson – engineering
Giles Twigg – engineering

"Adeste Fidelis"
Andy Patterson – bells, engineering
Gerry Rafferty – vocals, programming
Giles Twigg – engineering

"Silent Night"
Andy Patterson – engineering
Gerry Rafferty – vocals and programming
Giles Twigg – engineering

References

External links

2009 albums
Gerry Rafferty albums